is a Japanese novelist. He is the third son of literary critic Suekichi Aono.

Aono was born in Tokyo and studied literature at Waseda University but left the university early to travel. After visiting Europe and Northern Africa, he returned to Japan in 1971, publishing his first work in the Waseda literary magazine. From 1972 to 1977 he travelled through Europe again.

Upon his return to Japan, Aono became active in literary and critical writings. He currently lives in Tokyo and is a Professor of Literature at Tama Art University.

Aono has translated works by Charles Bukowski into Japanese.

Awards
1979 - Akutagawa Prize for "Gusha no yoru" (Night of the Fools).
1998 - Minister of Education Award for "Art for Ningen no itonami" (Human Conduct).
1991 - Yomiuri Literary Prize for Haha yo (O Mother).

References

External links
Virtual Writing University Interview (audio 28 minutes)
So Aono at J'Lit Books from Japan 
Synopsis of O Mother (Haha yo) at JLPP (Japanese Literature Publishing Project)

20th-century Japanese novelists
21st-century Japanese novelists
Living people
People from Tokyo
Akutagawa Prize winners
Yomiuri Prize winners
1943 births